Monster Beach is an Australian television series created by Bruce Kane, Maurice Argiro (who also created Kitty Is Not a Cat) and Patrick Crawley, which first premiered as a 70 minute TV special on Cartoon Network on 31 October 2014 and was then later commissioned as a full series airing in 2020. Originally produced by the companies Bogan Entertainment Solutions (later Studio Moshi) and Fragrant Gumtree Entertainment (in association with Cartoon Network Asia Pacific), it's the second locally animated production to be commissioned by the channel after Exchange Student Zero. It was released on DVD on 1 June 2016 from Madman Entertainment.

In 2017, a series was greenlit by Cartoon Network for a 52 episode TV series consisting of 11 minute episodes; a pilot episode based on the televised film itself was announced but never released.

The series started airing on Cartoon Network Australia on 11 April 2020 and won Best Animated TV Programme at the 2020 Content Asia Awards. Monster Beach is animated by Studio Moshi in Australia
and Inspidea in Malaysia.

Voice cast
 Kazumi Evans - Jan / Murmurmaid 2
 Elishia Perosa - Dean 
 Rove McManus - The Mutt, Dr Knutt, Hodad 
 Bill Newton - Brainfreeze 
 Kelly Sheridan - Widget / Murmurmaid 1 
 Brian Dobson - Lost Patrol / Headache
 Nadeen Lightbody - Amphibia
 Patrick Crawley - Mad Madge
 Hiro Kanagawa - Stress Leave
 Stephen Hall - Butterfield
 Brian Drummond - The Tikis 
 Garry Chalk - Uncle Woody

Episodes
 It Cone From Outer Space
 Knutt Drops In
 Ghoul Vibrations
 Frights Camera Action
 Striking Bad
 Doommates
 I Lava To Surf
 Tiki'D Off
 Next To Dogliness
 Termite Nation
 Gone Wishin
 Swampy Thing
 Lagoon Goons
 High Seas Hi Jinx
 Widget Loses her Head
 Knutty And Nice
 Surf Power
 Treasure Hunters
 Bored Games
 Talk to the Hand
 The Back Nine
 Madge's Broken Mug
 Switch Doctor
 Micro Monsters
 Monster Safari
 Pet Rocked
 Lost and Found Patrol
 Brain Thaw
 Fan Service
 Whale of a Problem
 Euro So Talented
 Butterknutt Squash
 The Murmurrmen Boys
 Boo Plate Special
 You've Been Served
 Devil May Careful
 Monster Wrestling
 Jailhouse Mutt
 Monster Make Over
 Three Monsters and a Tiki
 Doctor BFF
 Monster Nerd Out
 Short on Shorts
 Where Wolf?
 Mayor or Mayor Not
 Rain Damage
 Teddle's Teddy
 Invisible Manny

References

External links
  (TV movie)
  (TV series)
 

Australian television films
Cartoon Network television films
2014 television films
2020s Australian animated television series
Australian children's animated television series
Films about vacationing
Television series about vacationing